Eduard Wagnes (18 March 1863 in Graz, Austria – 27 March 1936 in Bad Gams, Austria) was a conductor in the Austro-Hungarian Military, and composer of military marches. His most famous composition was "Die Bosniaken Kommen", composed in 1895.

Other compositions
 Die Bosniaken kommen - 1895
 Flitsch Marsch - 1928
 Felsenfest für's Vaterland - 1932
 Helden von Meletta - 1932
 Ausseer Buam
 Durch dick und dünn
 Für Freiheit und Ehr
 Hand in Hand
 Heldenhaft Marsch
 Mit eisener Kraft
 Ritterlich
 Zum Schutz und Trutz

Dramatic music
 1910 Alt-Wien, operette - libretto: Ferdinand Maierfeld-Enter
 1911 Die Klosterprinzessin, operette - libretto: Hans Pflanzer

1863 births
1936 deaths
Austrian male composers
Austrian composers